Maryhill Estates is a home rule-class city in Jefferson County, Kentucky, United States. The population was 179 as of the 2010 census.

Maryhill Estates incorporated in 1963 and was developed in the early 1960s. Developer John A. Walser purchased the land from the Archdiocese of Louisville after World War II and named the development after the Virgin Mary.

It is one of numerous small cities in Jefferson County which have resisted annexation or merger. Merger with nearby St. Matthews or Windy Hills has been discussed but not pursued.

Geography
Maryhill Estates is located in northeastern Jefferson County at  (38.266370, -85.652726). It is bordered to the north by Windy Hills, to the south by St. Matthews, and otherwise by consolidated Louisville/Jefferson County. The city consists solely of houses along six streets: Maryhill Lane, Crestview Road, Yancy Lane, Ormond Road, Maryknoll Lane, and Fatima Lane.

Demographics

As of the census of 2000, there were 175 people, 62 households, and 54 families residing in the city. The racial makeup of the city was 97.71% White, 1.14% Asian and 1.14% Pacific Islander.

There were 62 households, out of which 38.7% had children under the age of 18 living with them, 87.1% were married couples living together, 1.6% had a female householder with no husband present, and 11.3% were non-families. 11.3% of all households were made up of individuals, and 6.5% had someone living alone who was 65 years of age or older. The average household size was 2.82 and the average family size was 3.04.

In the city, the population was spread out, with 29.1% under the age of 18, 3.4% from 18 to 24, 20.6% from 25 to 44, 23.4% from 45 to 64, and 23.4% who were 65 years of age or older. The median age was 43 years. For every 100 females, there were 103.5 males. For every 100 females age 18 and over, there were 93.8 males.

The median income for a household in the city was $101,753, and the median income for a family was $104,104. Males had a median income of $71,875 versus $35,417 for females. The per capita income for the city was $30,953. None of the families and 2.2% of the population were living below the poverty line, including no under eighteens and 6.1% of those over 64.

References

Cities in Jefferson County, Kentucky
Cities in Kentucky
Populated places established in 1963
1963 establishments in Kentucky